Brachyamblyopus brachysoma is a species of goby native to fresh and brackish waters of southern and southeastern Asia and possibly occurring in Africa and the Persian Gulf.  This species grows to a length of  TL.  This species is the only known member of its genus.

References

Amblyopinae
Monotypic fish genera
Fish described in 1854